Polystemonanthus is a genus of flowering plants in the family Fabaceae. It belongs to the subfamily Detarioideae. It contains a single species, Polystemonanthus dinklagei.

Detarioideae
Monotypic Fabaceae genera